Conus jucundus, common name Abbott's cone, is a species of sea snail, a marine gastropod mollusk in the family Conidae, the cone snails and their allies.

Like all species within the genus Conus, these snails are predatory and venomous. They are capable of "stinging" humans, therefore live ones should be handled carefully or not at all.

Distribution
This marine species occurs off the Bahamas.

Description 
The maximum recorded shell length is 43 mm.

Habitat 
Minimum recorded depth is 0.3 m. Maximum recorded depth is 0.3 m.

References

 Filmer R.M. (2001). A Catalogue of Nomenclature and Taxonomy in the Living Conidae 1758 – 1998. Backhuys Publishers, Leiden. 388pp.
 Tucker J.K. (2009). Recent cone species database. September 4, 2009 Edition.
 Tucker J.K. & Tenorio M.J. (2009) Systematic classification of Recent and fossil conoidean gastropods. Hackenheim: Conchbooks. 296 pp.
 Petit, R. E. (2009). George Brettingham Sowerby, I, II & III: their conchological publications and molluscan taxa. Zootaxa. 2189: 1–218
 Puillandre N., Duda T.F., Meyer C., Olivera B.M. & Bouchet P. (2015). One, four or 100 genera? A new classification of the cone snails. Journal of Molluscan Studies. 81: 1–23

External links
 The Conus Biodiversity website
 Cone Shells – Knights of the Sea
 

jucundus
Gastropods described in 1887